Greeneyes are deep-sea aulopiform marine fishes in the small family Chlorophthalmidae. Thought to have a circumglobal distribution in tropical and temperate waters, the family contains just 18 species in two genera. The family name Chlorophthalmidae derives from the Greek words chloros meaning "green" and ophthalmos meaning "eye".

Some species are of interest to commercial and subsistence fisheries; the fish are made into fish meal or sold fresh.

Description 
Aptly named after their disproportionately large, iridescent (as well as fluorescent) eyes, greeneyes are slender fish with slightly compressed bodies. Their heads are small with large jaws. Their coloration ranges from a yellowish to blackish brown, and some species have cryptic blotches.

Their fins are simple and spineless; aside from their eyes, some species also have iridescent patches covering their heads.

Behaviour and reproduction 
They seem to prefer the continental slopes and shelves, possibly forming schools. Greeneyes are known to primarily feed on benthic invertebrates, as well as pelagic crustaceans such as decapods and mysids.

Like many aulopiform fish, greeneyes are hermaphroditic; this is thought to be a great advantage in deep-sea habitats, where the chances of running into a compatible mate are uncertain. Young and larval greeneyes are pelagic rather than benthic, staying within the upper levels of the water column. Hake are known predators of greeneyes.

Classification 
The genus Bathysauroides is sometimes classified with the greeneyes, but this article follows FishBase in placing it in its own family, Bathysauroididae.

References 

 

Chlorophthalmidae
Taxa named by David Starr Jordan